Kirsten Blair (born 29 July 1984) is a South African former cricketer who played as an all-rounder, batting right-handed and bowling right-arm medium. She appeared in two One Day Internationals for South Africa in 2007, both against Pakistan. She played domestic cricket for Easterns and Gauteng, as well as appearing in one tour match for Northerns.

References

External links
 
 

1984 births
Living people
People from Boksburg
South African women cricketers
South Africa women One Day International cricketers
Easterns women cricketers
Northerns women cricketers
Central Gauteng women cricketers